Agrostis humilis is a species of grass known by the common names of mountain bent grass and alpine bentgrass, which can be found in Western United States and Canada.

Description
They also carry both a pediceled fertile spikelet and one fertile floret which have a hairless callus.

Fertile lemma is of the same size as glumes and is both elliptic and hyaline.

Conservation
In California, the plant is considered endangered.

References

External links
Photo gallery

humilis
Flora of the United States
Flora of Canada
Flora of California
Flora without expected TNC conservation status